The AAI Aerosonde is a small unmanned aerial vehicle (UAV) designed to collect weather data, including temperature, atmospheric pressure, humidity, and wind measurements over oceans and remote areas.  The Aerosonde was developed by Insitu, and is now manufactured by Aerosonde Ltd, which is a strategic business of AAI Corporation.  The Aerosonde is powered by a modified Enya R120 model aircraft engine, and carries on board a small computer, meteorological instruments, and a GPS receiver for navigation. It is also used by the United States Armed Forces for intelligence, surveillance and reconnaissance (ISR).

Design and development
On August 21, 1998, a Phase 1 Aerosonde nicknamed "Laima", after the ancient Latvian deity of good fortune, completed a 2,031 mile (3,270 km) flight across the Atlantic Ocean.  This was the first crossing of the Atlantic Ocean by a UAV; at the time, it was also the smallest aircraft ever to cross the Atlantic (the smallest aircraft record was subsequently broken by the Spirit of Butts Farm UAV).  Launched from a roof rack of a moving car due to its lack of undercarriage, Laima flew from Newfoundland, Canada to Benbecula, an island off the coast of Scotland in 26 hours 45 minutes in stormy weather, using approximately 1.5 U.S. gallons (1.25 imperial gallons or 5.7 litres) of gasoline (petrol).  Other than for take-off and landing, the flight was autonomous, without external control, at an altitude of 5,500 ft (1,680 meters). Aerosondes have also been the first unmanned aircraft to penetrate tropical cyclones, with an initial mission in 2001 followed by eye penetrations in 2005.

Operational history
On 5 March 2012, the U.S. Special Operations Command (SOCOM) awarded AAI a contract to provide the Aerosonde-G for their Mid-Endurance UAS II program.  The catapult-launched air vehicle has a takeoff weight  depending on engine type, with endurance of over 10 hours and an electro-optic/infrared and laser-pointer payload. The Aerosonde has been employed by SOCOM and U.S. Naval Air Systems Command (NAVAIR) under the designation MQ-19 under service provision contracts.  A typical system comprises four air vehicles and two ground control stations that are accommodated in tents or tailored to fit in most vehicles.  The system can also include remote video terminals for individual users to uplink new navigation waypoints and sensor commands to, and receive sensor imagery and video from, the vehicle from a ruggedized tablet device.  Originally, the Aerosonde suffered from engine-reliability issues, but Textron says it has rectified those issues.

By November 2015, Textron Systems was performing Aerosonde operations in "eight or nine" countries for its users, including the U.S. Marine Corps, U.S. Air Force, and SOCOM, as well as for commercial users consisting of a customer in the oil and gas industry.  Instead of buying hardware, customers pay for "sensor hours," and the company decides how many aircraft are produced to meet requirements.  4,000 fee-for-service hours were being performed monthly, and the Aerosonde had exceeded 110,000 flight hours in service.

Variants

Specifications (Aerosonde)

General characteristics
 Crew: Remote-Controlled 
 Length: 5 ft 8 in (1.7 m)
 Wingspan:  9 ft 8 in (2.9 m)
 Height:  2 ft 0 in (0.60 m)
 Wing area: 6.1 ft2 (0.57 m2)
 Empty: 22lb (10 kg)
 Loaded: 28.9 lb (13.1 kg)
 Maximum take-off:  28.9 lb (13.1 kg)
 Powerplant: Modified Enya R120 model aircraft engine, 1.74 hp (1280 W)
Lycoming El-005 Multi Fuel power plant

Performance
 Maximum speed: 69 mph (111 km/h)
 Range: 100 miles (150 km)
 Service ceiling: 15,000 ft (4,500 m)
 Rate of climb:  ft/min ( m/min) 
 Wing loading: 5 lb/ft2 (23 kg/m2)
 Power/Mass: 0.06 hp/lb (98 W/kg)

References

 Display information at Museum of Flight in Seattle, Washington.
 G.J. Holland, T. McGeer and H.H. Youngren.  Autonomous aerosondes for economical atmospheric soundings anywhere on the globe.  Bulletin of the American Meteorological Society 73(12):1987-1999, December 1992.
 

Cyclone reconnaissance
 P-H Lin & C-S Lee.  Fly into typhoon Haiyan with UAV Aerosonde.  American Meteorological Society conference paper 52113 (2002).
 NASA Wallops Flight Facility press release: "Aerosonde UAV Completes First Operational Flights at NASA Wallops"

Laima flight
 Tad McGeer. "Laima: The first Atlantic crossing by unmanned aircraft" (1998)
 Aerosonde Pty Ltd. press release: "First UAV across the Atlantic"
 University of Washington, Aeronautics and Astronautics Program, College of Engineering: (Aerosonde project web page)

External links

 Aerosonde Pty Ltd. web site

Meteorological instrumentation and equipment
Single-engined pusher aircraft
1990s United States special-purpose aircraft
Unmanned aerial vehicles of Australia